Ignacio Gastón Morales (born 11 February 1998) is an Argentine professional footballer who plays as a forward for Gimnasia y Esgrima.

Career
Morales' career started with Gimnasia y Esgrima. He featured on three occasions throughout the 2016–17 and 2017–18 seasons in Torneo Federal A, with the latter ending with promotion to Primera B Nacional. His professional debut subsequently arrived on 15 September 2018 against Chacarita Juniors, with the forward netting a ninetieth-minute winner in a 2–1 home victory; he had been substituted on two minutes prior.

Career statistics
.

References

External links

Ignacio Morales on gimnasiayesgrimamza.com.ar

1998 births
Living people
Place of birth missing (living people)
Argentine footballers
Association football forwards
Torneo Federal A players
Primera Nacional players
Gimnasia y Esgrima de Mendoza footballers